Charles Cameron "Trusty" Tallman (September 18, 1899 – November 16, 1973) was an American football player and, coach of football and basketball, and law enforcement officer. He served as the head football coach at Marshall University from 1925 to 1928 and at West Virginia University from 1934 to 1936, compiling a career college football record of 37–21–9. Tallman was also the head basketball coach at Marshall during the 1925–26 season, tallying a mark of 10–7. He resigned after the 1936 season to become the Superintendent of the West Virginia State Police. Tallman was also a member of the West Virginia Legislature. He later lived in Augusta, Georgia, where he died on November 16, 1973.

Head coaching record

Football

References

External links
 

1899 births
1973 deaths
20th-century American politicians
American football ends
American state police officers
Basketball coaches from West Virginia
Marshall Thundering Herd men's basketball coaches
Marshall Thundering Herd football coaches
West Virginia Mountaineers football coaches
West Virginia Mountaineers football players
Members of the West Virginia House of Delegates
People from Roane County, West Virginia